Longport railway station serves the areas of Longport, Middleport, Tunstall and Burslem, all districts in the northern part of Stoke-on-Trent, England. The station is served by trains on the Crewe to Derby Line, which is also a community rail line known as the North Staffordshire line. The station also has two trains a day on the Stoke-on-Trent to Manchester Piccadilly line. The station is owned by Network Rail and managed by East Midlands Railway.

History
The station was opened by the North Staffordshire Railway (NSR) on 9 October 1848 and was named Burslem. It was renamed to Longport when a new  station opened, which was much nearer to the town, after the NSR built their Loop Line.

Location and facilities
Longport is currently unstaffed. The station has 2 platforms, both of which are wheelchair accessible although the footbridge is not.

The station is adjacent to Longbridge Hayes industrial estate and the A500 road; as such, it sees a number of park and ride commuters. Longport station has its own bus stop which is served by routes 94, 98 and 99; these serve the nearby town of Newcastle-under-Lyme, for which Longport is the closest station.

This station is also the closest to Port Vale F.C.

Longport has cycle parking facilities, with a waiting shelter and real-time information displays on each platform.

The former station buildings have been sold into private ownership and have now been converted into a Hindu wedding venue.

Services
Services at Longport are operated by London Northwestern Railway, East Midlands Railway and Northern Trains.

These services are operated by Northern Trains.

The station is served by two trains per day to Crewe and three trains per day to Nottingham, of which two continue to Newark Castle.

On Sundays, East Midlands Railway operate all services at the station, with an hourly service between Crewe and Derby operating after approximately 14:00 only. No London Northwestern Railway or Northern Trains services call at the station on Sundays.

Avanti West Coast and CrossCountry services pass through the station but do not stop.

References

External links 

 

Railway stations in Stoke-on-Trent
DfT Category F2 stations
Former North Staffordshire Railway stations
Railway stations in Great Britain opened in 1848
Railway stations served by East Midlands Railway
Northern franchise railway stations
Railway stations served by West Midlands Trains